Bachir Sid Azara (born 3 March 1996) is an Algerian Greco-Roman wrestler. At the African Wrestling Championships he won a total of seven medals: four gold medals and three silver medals. He is also a gold medalist at the 2019 African Games and the 2022 Mediterranean Games.

Career 

He represented Algeria at the 2019 African Games held in Rabat, Morocco and he won the gold medal in the men's 87 kg event. In 2015, he also competed at the African Games and he won the silver medal in the men's 80 kg event at the time.

In 2020, he competed in the men's 87 kg event at the Individual Wrestling World Cup held in Belgrade, Serbia. He qualified at the 2021 African & Oceania Wrestling Olympic Qualification Tournament to represent Algeria at the 2020 Summer Olympics in Tokyo, Japan. He competed in the 87 kg event. He won his first match against Peng Fei of China and then lost against eventual gold medalist Zhan Beleniuk of Ukraine. In the repechage he was then eliminated by eventual bronze medalist Zurab Datunashvili of Serbia.

He won the gold medal in his event at the 2022 African Wrestling Championships held in El Jadida, Morocco. He won the gold medal in the 87 kg event at the 2022 Mediterranean Games held in Oran, Algeria. In the final, he defeated Mirco Minguzzi of Italy. He competed in the 87kg event at the 2022 World Wrestling Championships held in Belgrade, Serbia.

Achievements

References

External links 

 

Living people
Place of birth missing (living people)
Algerian male sport wrestlers
African Games gold medalists for Algeria
African Games silver medalists for Algeria
African Games medalists in wrestling
Competitors at the 2015 African Games
Competitors at the 2019 African Games
Mediterranean Games gold medalists for Algeria
Mediterranean Games silver medalists for Algeria
Mediterranean Games medalists in wrestling
Competitors at the 2018 Mediterranean Games
Competitors at the 2022 Mediterranean Games
African Wrestling Championships medalists
Islamic Solidarity Games medalists in wrestling
Wrestlers at the 2020 Summer Olympics
Olympic wrestlers of Algeria
1996 births
21st-century Algerian people